Tiamiou Adjibadé (15 July 1937 – 12 September 2006) was a Beninese politician. He was the foreign minister of Benin from 1982 to 1984.

References

1937 births
2006 deaths
Foreign ministers of Benin
20th-century Beninese politicians